Bihać Oblast was one of the oblasts of the Kingdom of Serbs, Croats and Slovenes from 1922 to 1929. Its administrative center was Bihać.

History 
The Kingdom of Serbs, Croats and Slovenes was formed in 1918 and was initially divided into counties and districts (this division was inherited from previous state administrations). In 1922, new administrative units known as oblasts (Serbo-Croatian: oblasti / области) were introduced and the whole country was divided into 33 oblasts. Before 1922, the territory of the Bihać Oblast was primarily part of the Bihać District.

In 1929, the 33 oblasts were administratively replaced with 9 banovinas and one district, and the territory of the Bihać Oblast was incorporated into the new Vrbas Banovina.

Geography 
The Bihać Oblast included western Bosanska Krajina. It shared borders with the Vrbas Oblast in the east, the Travnik Oblast in the south, and the Primorje-Krajina Oblast in the north-west.

Demographics 
According to 1921 census, the Bihać Oblast was linguistically dominated by speakers of Serbo-Croatian.

Cities and Towns 
The main cities and towns located within the oblast were:

 Bihać
 Bosanska Krupa
 Bosanski Petrovac
 Bužim
 Cazin
 Ključ
 Sanski Most
 Velika Kladuša

All mentioned cities and towns are now part of Bosnia and Herzegovina

See also 

 Bihać
 Kingdom of Serbs, Croats and Slovenes

References

Further reading 

 Istorijski atlas, Geokarta, Beograd, 1999.
 Istorijski atlas, Intersistem kartografija, Beograd, 2010.

 

Bihać
History of Bihać
History of Bosanska Krajina
Yugoslav Bosnia and Herzegovina
20th century in Bosnia and Herzegovina
Oblasts of the Kingdom of Serbs, Croats and Slovenes